John B. Ellington Jr. is a former major general in the Air National Guard and director of the National Guard Chaplain Corps and Air National Guard Assistant to the Chief of Chaplains of the United States Air Force.

Biography
An ordained Anglican priest, Ellington presides over Indian Lake Community Church in Russells Point, Ohio. He has attended Malone University, the Methodist Theological School in Ohio, Wright State University and Ashland Theological Seminary.

Career
Ellington joined the Air National Guard in 1979. He retired in 2011.

Awards he has received include the Defense Distinguished Service Medal, the Legion of Merit and the Meritorious Service Medal.

References

External links
Chaplain (Major General) John B. Ellington, Jr.

Year of birth missing (living people)
Living people
People from Logan County, Ohio
Malone University alumni
Methodist Theological School in Ohio alumni
American Methodist clergy
United States Air Force chaplains
Wright State University alumni
Ashland Theological Seminary alumni
Recipients of the Meritorious Service Medal (United States)
Recipients of the Legion of Merit
United States Air Force generals
Recipients of the Defense Distinguished Service Medal